LDS is the name given to various single seater racing specials built for the South African Formula One Championship. The "specials" were built by Louis Douglas Serrurier, hence the name. The Mark 1 and Mark 2 models were based on Cooper designs, whilst the Mark 3 was based on the Brabham BT11. Mark 1 and Mark 2 models (1962–1965) used Alfa Romeo 1.5-litre straight-4 engines.

A total of eight LDS cars participated in five World Championship Grands Prix. They did not score any World Championship points.

Complete Formula One World Championship results
(key) (results in bold indicate pole position) (results in italics indicate fastest lap)

References 
LDS Profile at Grand Prix Encyclopedia
Results from Formula1.com

Formula One constructors
Formula One entrants
South African auto racing teams
South African racecar constructors